The fifth edition of the football tournament at the Pan American Games was held in Winnipeg, Manitoba, Canada, from July 24 to August 3, 1967. Eight teams divided in two groups of four did compete in a round-robin competition, with Brazil defending the title. For the first time the tournament ended with a knock-out stage after the preliminary round.

First round

Group A

Notes

Group B

Final round

Bracket

Semi finals

Bronze medal match

Gold Medal match

Medalists

Goalscorers

References

1967
1967 Pan American Games
Pan American Games
Pan American Games
Pan American Games
1967–68 in Mexican football
1967
Soccer in Manitoba